Sébastien Lifshitz (born 21 January 1968) is a French screenwriter and director. He teaches at La Fémis, a school that focuses on the subject of image and sound. He studied at the École du Louvre, and has a bachelor's degree from the University of Paris in history of art. He is Jewish, and gay.

Career
Lifshitz's work involves LGBTQ+ themes. His 2004 film, Wild Side, involves several narratives, some told forward and some backward, about a transgender prostitute.

He is a two-time winner of the Teddy Award, presented by an independent committee at the Berlin International Film Festival to the year's best films with LGBT themes, winning Best Feature Film in 2004 for Wild Side and Best Documentary Film in 2013 for Bambi, a documentary profile of transgender French entertainer Marie-Pierre Pruvot.

On 20 May 2014, Rizzoli International published Lifshitz's The Invisibles: Vintage Portraits of Love and Pride, a collection of gay-themed photos from the early 20th century.

Filmography

Bibliography 
Rees-Robertsn, N. French Queer Cinema (2008).
Reeser, T. "Representing gay male domesticity in French film of the late 1990s," In Queer Cinema in Europe (2008).
Reeser, T. "Transsexuality and the Disruption of Time in Sebastien Lifshitz's Wild Side," in Studies in French Cinema (2007).

References

External links
 

1968 births
French male screenwriters
French screenwriters
20th-century French Jews
University of Paris alumni
Living people
Film directors from Paris
LGBT Jews
LGBT film directors
French LGBT screenwriters
Chevaliers of the Ordre des Arts et des Lettres
French gay writers